Josip Jović (21 November 1969 – 31 March 1991) was a Croatian policeman who was killed during the Plitvice Lakes incident. He is widely considered the first Croatian fatality of the Croatian War of Independence.

Jović was born on 21 November 1969 in the village of Aržano, near Imotski, to Filip and Marija Jović. He was raised with four siblings, brother Tomislav and sisters Franka, Mirna and Anita. After completing his compulsory military service in a JNA Mechanised Infantry unit in Montenegro between 1987 and 1989, on 5 August 1990, Jović joined the Croatian Ministry of the Interior (MUP) Unit for Special Purposes in Zagreb. On 29 March 1991, the Plitvice Lakes management was expelled by rebel Krajina Serb police under the control of Milan Martić, supported by paramilitary volunteers from Serbia proper under the command of Vojislav Šešelj. On Easter Sunday, 31 March 1991, Croatian police officers entered the national park to expel the Serb rebels. Serb paramilitaries ambushed a bus carrying Croatian police into the national park on the road north of Korenica, sparking a day-long gun battle between the two sides. Jović was struck by a burst of fire at the post-office building, penetrating his bulletproof vest. His colleague, Mladen Pavković, later described Jović's last moments before he was transferred to the ambulance. When a Yugoslav People's Army helicopter landed to transfer him to hospital, Jović was already dead. He was buried with military honors at the cemetery in Aržano.

Honors
Jović was posthumously promoted to the rank of major. He was awarded with the Order of Petar Zrinski and Fran Krsto Frankopan, Homeland War Memorial Medal, 1st Guards Brigade Memorial badge and Memorial Medal of the first killed Ministry of the Interior police officer during the Croatian War of Independence.

On 29 September 2011, the Croatian prime minister, Jadranka Kosor, opened the "Police Academy Josip Jović" in Jović's honour.

References

1969 births
1991 deaths
People from Imotski
Croatian police officers killed in the line of duty
People of the Croatian War of Independence